Ronald M. Schernikau (July 11, 1960 – October 20, 1991) was a German writer. Schernikau was born in Magdeburg and died in Berlin. Schernikau largely wrote about LGBT issues in Germany, and was one of the few to defect from West Germany to East Germany.

Life 

His mother moved from Magdeburg, East Germany, to Lehrte, West Germany, in 1966 to reunite with Ronald's father, but upon arriving, they discovered that he was a Neo-Nazi and had a second family. Schernikau and his mother remained in Lehrte nonetheless.

At 16, he joined the German Communist Party (DKP). Even before he graduated from high school at Lehrter Gymnasium, his short novel Kleinstadtnovelle was published by Rotbuch Verlag in 1980. The book, which was about coming out as gay in a small town, was a remarkable debut, and the first edition had to be reprinted just a few days after its release. The same year, Schernikau moved to West Berlin, where he joined  the Socialist Unity Party of West Berlin (SEW) and enrolled in German, philosophy and psychology at Freie Universität. During this time, Schernikau wrote for various left-wing publications on topics such as the baking industry and the HIV/AIDS epidemic.

From 1986 to 1989 Schernikau studied at the Johannes R. Becher German Institute for Literature  in Leipzig, East Germany – the first West German to do so. There he wrote his book die tage in l. darüber, dass die ddr und die brd sich niemals verständigen können, geschweige mittels ihrer literatur ["The days in L.: On the fact that East and West Germany can never communicate, least of all through their literature"], which discussed how East and West Germans perceived each other.

In September 1991, Schernikau completed his book legende ["Legend"], only weeks before dying of AIDS-related illnesses.

Legacy 
In recent years, there has been a renewed interest in Schernikau's life and works. The German journalist Matthias Frings published a biography about Schernikau in 2009. German director  produced a play on Schernikau in 2014, which the German newspaper Die Tageszeitung reported was sold out nearly every night.

References 

1991 deaths
1960 births
Socialist Unity Party of Germany members
Socialist Unity Party of West Berlin politicians
German Communist Party members
Writers from Berlin
German gay writers
German LGBT novelists
German essayists
German-language writers
Gay novelists
AIDS-related deaths in Germany
20th-century LGBT people